State Highway 93 (SH-93) is a state highway in Bihar State. This state highway passes through three major districts (Vaishali district, Samastipur district and Begusarai District).

Route
The route of SH-93 from west to east is as follows:

 Jadhua (Hajipur)
 Bidupur
 Mahnar
 Mohiuddinagar
 Vidyapati Dham railway station 
 Bachhwara (Begusarai)

Note: from Bechhwara, NH-122 move north towards Dalsingh Sarai and south towards Barauni and Begusarai.

References

State Highways in Bihar
Transport in Hajipur